is a former Japanese football player.

Club statistics

References

External links

1984 births
Living people
Association football people from Okayama Prefecture
Japanese footballers
J1 League players
J2 League players
Gamba Osaka players
Tokushima Vortis players
Kamatamare Sanuki players
FC Osaka players
Association football midfielders